The Kokshetau Children's Railway was a narrow gauge children's railway in Kokshetau in Kazakhstan.
It had one railway stations. The railway was inaugrarated on 6 August 1978 as one of the many pioneer railways in the Soviet Union. It was taken out of service and dismantled in 1996.

Route 
It had one station.

Overview
It was fully operated by teenagers.  One of many children's railways that existed in the USSR and continued functioning after its breakup in post-Soviet states, it was opened on 6 August 1978 and continued functioning until 1996.
The railway line counted 1 station: Sinegorie (or Sinegorye).

Rolling stock

Carriages 
The trains had the names such as Yunyy Kokchetavets (Юный Кокчетавец, Young Kokshetau resident) and so on.

See also

Children's railway
Rail transport in Kazakhstan
Kazakhstan Railways
Kokshetau railway station

References

External links 
Kokshetau children's railway (on dzd-ussr.ru)

Transport in Kokshetau
Transport infrastructure completed in 1978
Kokchetav Oblast
Children's railways
Railway lines in Kazakhstan
750 mm gauge railways in Kazakhstan
Railway lines opened in 1978
Kokshetau